Rafael Nadal defeated the defending champion Novak Djokovic in the final, 7–6(7–2), 6–2 to win the men's singles tennis title at the 2009 Italian Open. It was his record fourth Italian Open title. He did not lose a single set in the entire tournament.

Seeds
The top eight seeds receive a bye into the second round.

Draw

Finals

Top half

Section 1

Section 2

Bottom half

Section 3

Section 4

Qualifying

Seeds

Qualifiers

Qualifying draw

First qualifier

Second qualifier

Third qualifier

Fourth qualifier

Fifth qualifier

Sixth qualifier

Seventh qualifier

External links
Main Draw
Qualifying Draw

Italian Open - Singles
Men's Singles